Federalist No. 20 is an essay by James Madison, the twentieth of The Federalist Papers. It was published on December 11, 1787, under the pseudonym Publius, the name under which all The Federalist papers were published. No. 20 addresses the failures of the Articles of Confederation to satisfactorily govern the United States; it is the last of six essays on this topic. It is titled "The Same Subject Continued: The Insufficiency of the Present Confederation to Preserve the Union".

Summary
Parallels are drawn with the Dutch Republic system of Stadholdership.

External links 

 Text of The Federalist No. 20: congress.gov
The Federalist No. 20 Text

1787 in American law
20
1787 essays
1787 in the United States